Fútbol de Primera may refer to:

Fútbol de Primera (TV program), an Argentine television program
Fútbol de Primera (radio network), an American radio network